Alices Yannel Correa Santa Cruz (born 10 September 1996) is a Spanish-born Uruguayan footballer who plays as a defender for Spanish Primera Federación club Real Oviedo and the Uruguay women's national team.

Early life
Correa was born to Uruguayan parents in Badajoz, Spain in 1996. At that time, her father, former Uruguay international footballer Gabriel Correa, was playing for AD Mérida. After her father finished his career, her family (which includes an older brother) settled in Murcia, the first Spanish city where her father had played and where her brother was born.

Club career
Nicknamed La Negra (The Black), Correa made her debut for Murcia Féminas in 2010, at age 13 or 14. The team promoted to Segunda División in 2011 and was Group 7 runner-up in the 2012–13 season. On 26 June 2013, she was signed by fellow Segunda División team Sporting Plaza de Argel, where she would spend the next three seasons. In July 2016, she returned to Murcia Féminas. On 10 February 2017, she was signed by Primera División side Fundación Albacete. She made her debut for them on 18 February 2017 in an away lost against Atlético Madrid. She broke the meniscus and the cruciate ligament in early October 2017, after being an unused substitute in the first two league matches of the 2017-2018 season.

International career
Due to her birthplace and her background, Correa is eligible to play for Spain or Uruguay. She chose the latter. In February 2018, she was one of the six Uruguayan players abroad who were reserved to play for the country at the 2018 Copa América Femenina.

International goals

References

External links
Yannel Correa at BDFútbol
Yannel Correa at LaLiga.es (in Spanish)
Yannel Correa at Txapeldunak.com (in Spanish)

1996 births
Living people
People with acquired Uruguayan citizenship
Uruguayan women's footballers
Women's association football central defenders
Uruguay women's international footballers
Sportspeople from Badajoz
Footballers from Extremadura
Spanish women's footballers
Fundación Albacete players
Sporting Plaza de Argel players
Real Oviedo (women) players
Primera División (women) players
Segunda Federación (women) players
Spanish people of Uruguayan descent
Sportspeople of Uruguayan descent